Kareshk (also Romanized as Kāreshk; also known as Barīshk, Barishk, and Boreshk) is a village in Nimbeluk Rural District, Nimbeluk District, Qaen County, South Khorasan Province, Iran. At the 2006 census, its population was 256, in 94 families.

References 

Populated places in Qaen County